Mount Stromlo High School is a public high school located in Waramanga, Australian Capital Territory. Mount Stromlo came into being after the merger of Weston Creek high school & Holder high school in 1990. The school is a traditional coeducational public school for students in year 7 to year 10.

School Houses
The school houses are named after nearby mountains and are represented by the students and teachers at school events such as the swimming carnival, athletics carnival, cross country, year challenges and various other competitions. The school houses and colours are as follows:

Oakey: red, with a redback spider as the mascot.

Cooleman: green, with a crocodile as the mascot.

Reef: blue, with a shark as the mascot.

Taylor: yellow, with a tiger as the mascot.

References

High schools in the Australian Capital Territory